Enewetak Auxiliary Airfield is a private airport at Enewetak on Enewetak Atoll, Marshall Islands. This airport is assigned the location identifier ENT by the IATA.

Facilities 
Enewetak Auxiliary Airfield has one runway designated 06/24, with an asphalt surface measuring 7,700 x 148 ft (2,347 x 45 m) at an elevation of 13 feet (4 m) above mean sea level. The runway is badly deteriorated and officially reserved for emergency landings only. Runway was built as part of the Naval Base Eniwetok.

Airlines and destinations

References 

Airports in the Marshall Islands